The 2021–22 North Carolina A&T Aggies men's basketball team represented North Carolina Agricultural and Technical State University in the 2021–22 NCAA Division I men's basketball season. The Aggies, led by second-year head coach Willie Jones, played their home games at the Corbett Sports Center in Greensboro, North Carolina as members of the Big South Conference.

The 2021–22 season will be the program's only season as a Big South member. North Carolina AT&T will join the Colonial Athletic Association on July 1, 2022.

Previous season
The Aggies finished the 2020–21 season 11–10, 7–1 in MEAC, their last season in the conference, to finish in first place in the Southern Division. The Aggies' MEAC tournament Round was cancelled.

Roster

Schedule and results

|-
!colspan=12 style=| Regular season

|-
!colspan=12 style=|Big South Conference regular season
|-

|-
!colspan=12 style=|Big South tournament

|-

Sources

References

North Carolina A&T Aggies men's basketball seasons
North Carolina A&T Aggies
North Carolina A&T Aggies men's basketball
North Carolina A&T Aggies men's basketball